Sejongdaewangneung Station is a railway station on Gyeonggang Line of the Seoul Metropolitan Subway.

Station Layout

External links

Metro stations in Yeoju
Seoul Metropolitan Subway stations
Railway stations opened in 2016
Gyeonggang Line
Korail stations